Partapur is a village in Bidar district of the state of Karnataka, India. According to 2011 Census information, the location code or village code of Partapur is 599747. Partapur is located in Basavakalyan Tehsil of Bidar district in Karnataka, India. As per 2009 stats, Partapur village is also a gram panchayat.

Partapur has a total population of 5,077 people. There are about 903 houses in Partapur village.

Villages in Bidar district